Gaoqi (高崎) may refer to:
 Xiamen Gaoqi International Airport, in Huli District of Xiamen City, Fujian, China
 Xiamen Gaoqi railway station, formerly known as Xiamen North Railway Station, train station in Huli District of Xiamen City, near the above-mentioned airport
 Gaoqi station, a metro station on Line 1 (Xiamen Metro)

See also
 Takasaki (高崎)